Selena La Rue Hatch is an American politician and a member of the Nevada State Assembly. A Democrat, she represents the 25th district.

References

External links 
 Official Website
 Selena La Rue Hatch on Ballotpedia

Democratic Party members of the Nevada Assembly
Living people
Boston University alumni
21st-century women politicians
Year of birth missing (living people)